The Homosexual Matrix is a book by American psychologist Clarence Arthur Tripp, in which the author discusses the biological and sociological implications of homosexuality, and also attempts to explain heterosexuality and bisexuality. The book was first published in 1975 by McGraw-Hill Book Company; it was republished in a revised edition in 1987. Based on his review of the evidence, Tripp argues that people do not become homosexual due to factors such as hormone levels, fear of the opposite sex, or the influence of dominant and close-binding mothers, and that the amount of attention fathers give to their sons has no effect on the development of homosexuality. He criticizes Sigmund Freud and argues that psychoanalytic theories of the development of homosexuality are untenable and based on false assumptions. He maintains that sexual orientation is not innate and depends on learning, that early puberty and early masturbation are important factors in the development of male homosexuality, and that a majority of adults are heterosexual because their socialization has made them want to be heterosexual. He criticizes psychotherapeutic attempts to convert homosexuals to heterosexuality and argues in favor of social tolerance of homosexuality and non-conformist behavior in general.

The book was controversial and received many negative reviews. It was criticized for Tripp's rambling style, sexism, views about the biological basis of male and female sexual behavior, focus on male homosexuality and neglect of lesbianism, and failure to discuss the gay liberation movement. The book drew a negative reaction from psychoanalysts, who criticized Tripp's dismissive treatment of psychoanalytic theories, accused him of being biased in favor of homosexuality, charged that he mistakenly claimed that gay men tend to have a larger than average penis size, and objected to his discussion of attempts to change homosexuality through psychotherapy. Tripp himself believed that The Homosexual Matrix had received a negative reaction from the gay media and from some gay people. Nevertheless, the book was influential and has received praise as an important work on homosexuality. Some commentators complimented Tripp's criticism of psychotherapy and supported his view that erotic feeling depends on resistances to its satisfaction.

Publication history
The Homosexual Matrix was first published by McGraw-Hill Book Company in 1975. A revised edition with a new preface was published by New American Library in 1987.

Reception
The Homosexual Matrix was influential and widely read, reportedly selling nearly half a million copies. The book has received praise from gay authors such as the historian Martin Duberman, the scholar John Lauritsen, the playwright Larry Kramer, the historian Jonathan Ned Katz, the novelist Lewis Gannett, the novelist Gore Vidal, and the journalist Paul Varnell. Kramer called the work the first book from a "reputable source" that "dared to openly speak of homosexuality as a healthy occurrence", Katz commented that prior to its publication "you could count on one hand the books on the subject that had any intellectual substance", Gannett called it "the first work to explain in cogent psychological terms why homosexuality is not a developmental failure to achieve heterosexuality" and wrote that Pomeroy considered it the best book on homosexuality he had ever read, Vidal described it as "ground-breaking", and Varnell described it as one of the ten best non-fiction books relating to homosexuality. However, the book was controversial. According to Gannett, Tripp's view that "gay people and straight people develop their orientations in exactly the same ways" appalled "many clinicians and much of the general public". In 1987, Tripp wrote that no sentence in the book stirred such a "hateful reaction" as Tripp's comment that, "When two men are excited and unrestrained in their sexual interaction, the fire that is fed from both sides often does whip up levels of eroticism that are very rarely reached elsewhere." Tripp wrote that it had been used to wrongly portray him as maintaining that homosexuality is an inherently superior form of sexual expression. In 1996, Duberman criticized the book's "misogynistic passages". 

According to the writer Paul Moor, the psychoanalyst Irving Bieber filed an ethics complaint against Tripp with the American Psychological Association. Bieber accused Tripp, in a passage of The Homosexual Matrix in which Tripp alluded to Bieber and his work Homosexuality: A Psychoanalytic Study of Male Homosexuals (1962), of impugning his scientific honesty and credibility by claiming that he knew of only one patient whom he had helped to become heterosexual and was on such poor terms with him that he could not contact him so that he could validate Bieber's claim to have changed his sexual orientation. However, the APA concluded that there was no evidence of unethical behavior on Tripp's part.

Authors who have complimented aspects of The Homosexual Matrix include the anthropologist Donald Symons, the philosopher Timothy F. Murphy, the queer theorist David M. Halperin, and the journalist Philip Nobile. Symons considered Tripp's hypothesis that erotic feeling depends on "resistance" plausible. He endorsed his view that sexual encounters between men often involve intense levels of eroticism seldom reached elsewhere. Murphy endorsed Tripp's criticism of conversion therapy. Halperin credited Tripp with significantly expanding on Kinsey's discussion of inversion, while Nobile believed that The Homosexual Matrix "completed Kinsey's work" on homosexuality. However, the historian of science Brian Easlea considered it regrettable that Tripp did not further explore the way in which male sexual attraction depends on motifs of dominance.

Some of Tripp's claims have been criticized as inaccurate or misleading. The psychiatrist Ruth Tiffany Barnhouse maintained that while The Homosexual Matrix had been praised for its avoidance of bias, it contains multiple misrepresentations. She noted that while Tripp cited an article by Beach as evidence that homosexual behavior is common throughout the animal kingdom, his bibliography included a subsequent article by Beach rejecting his earlier claim on the basis of further research. She criticized Tripp's understanding of masculinity, relations between the sexes, and sexual attraction, as well as his use of the term "inversion", noting that it differs from that originally employed by psychiatrists. She also wrote that Tripp was incorrect to claim that no cures of homosexuality have ever been reported, that his discussion of therapeutic treatment of homosexuality was confused, and that many of her colleagues considered his "slipshod methods and lack of scholarship beneath intellectual contempt and have refused to even dignify his work with a reply." The social theorist Jonathan Dollimore described Tripp's account of psychoanalytic theories of homosexuality as an over-simplification bordering on parody.

Tripp's views about the causes of homosexuality have been criticized. The economist Richard Posner wrote that Tripp revives the psychiatrist Richard von Krafft-Ebing's theory that masturbation helps to cause homosexuality by fixating a boy on the male genitals, based on evidence that homosexuals begin masturbating earlier than heterosexuals. He criticized the theory on the grounds that homosexuality and early masturbation could both be effects of whatever factor might be responsible for causing homosexuality. The geneticist Dean Hamer credited Tripp with providing the clearest articulation of the social learning theory of sexual orientation. However, he found the theory itself implausible, and rejected it on numerous grounds, arguing that it is inconsistent with anthropological evidence and human evolutionary history, and fails to explain the existence of homosexuality. The psychologist Alan P. Bell and the sociologists Martin S. Weinberg and Sue Kiefer Hammersmith considered Tripp correct to caution against speculation about the role of maternal relationships in the development of male homosexuality, but noted that some studies suggest that "prehomosexual" boys have atypical relationships with their mothers.

The Homosexual Matrix received positive reviews from the novelist George Whitmore in The Advocate and Fritz A. Fluckiger in the Journal of Homosexuality, as well as from the Atlantic Monthly. The book received a mixed review from David A. Begelman in the Journal of Homosexuality. The book received negative reviews from Robb McKenzie in Library Journal, the author J. M. Cameron in The New York Review of Books, Michael Lynch in The Body Politic, Phil Derbyshire in Gay Left, and Harriet Whitehead in Signs. Negative reviews from psychoanalysts included those from Herbert Hendin in The New York Times, Arno Karlen in the Journal of Sex Research, and Charles W. Socarides in the American Journal of Psychiatry.

Whitmore considered the book "the second great contemporary landmark in the study of homosexuality", following the Kinsey Reports. He described it as a "revolutionary work" that would elicit outrage from psychiatrists. He credited Tripp with showing the "diversity and fluidity of sexual identity" and the way in which "inversion and effeminacy" relate to other forms of human behavior, and with making the most "devastating attack" on therapeutic attempts to convert homosexuals to heterosexuality since George Weinberg's Society and the Healthy Homosexual (1972). He praised Tripp's discussions of "gay sexual response" and the politics of homosexuality. However, he observed that Tripp did not discuss the gay movement and that his "centrist" political views did not necessarily correspond to those of the gay liberation movement, and suggested that feminists, and some gay people, would dislike the book. He stated that it had been seen by two publishers before it was published by McGraw-Hill, and its publication had at one stage been in doubt because of the contents of its "chapters on politics and psychiatry". He attributed the problems involved in publishing the book, along with the negative review by Hendin, to prejudice. Fluckiger called the book "easily the most provocative work on sexuality to have appeared in a long time" and credited Tripp with offering a powerful challenge to established views about homosexuality and showing command of a range of data from many fields. He maintained that Tripp offered the most novel account of the way in which behavioral expression communicates internal states since the naturalist Charles Darwin's The Expression of the Emotions in Man and Animals (1872), but considered his most original contribution to be his explanation of how erotic feeling depends on "resistance".  The Atlantic Monthly described the book as "well-written", "authoritative", and "indispensable" for readers with a serious interest in homosexuality. It stated that Tripp contradicted most generally held beliefs about the origins of homosexuality with "an impressive mass of evidence".

Begelman called Tripp a skillful writer who was learned on the subject of homosexuality, but whose objectivity was nevertheless open to question. McKenzie wrote that Tripp only partially succeeded in his goal of describing homosexuality, that his bibliography omitted basic works and included some dubious sources, and that while some of Tripp's observations were thought-provoking, others were ludicrous. He also described the book as a rambling, awkwardly written, and poorly organized anecdotal survey. Cameron called Tripp "vulgar" and prejudiced and characterized Tripp's evidence as "largely literary." He criticized Tripp for treating the Kinsey Reports as authoritative, writing that they were out of date. He also criticized Tripp for being careless in his discussion of history and for focusing mainly on male homosexuality and neglecting lesbianism. He was convinced by Tripp's argument that strains and tensions are necessary in a relationship to keep the partners interested in each other, and found his discussion of psychotherapy insightful.

Lynch wrote that while initially delighted by the work, he later concluded that it was a "deceptive book inadequate to its task" that the gay movement should not endorse. In his view, Tripp made many claims without empirical evidence and neglected lesbianism and female sexuality in general. He argued that Tripp's understanding of sexual relations between men and women, and his account of how tension between the sexes creates erotic excitement, were influenced by biological determinism. He found Tripp's discussion of why societies have increased divisions between the sexes interesting, but also poorly worked out. He accepted Tripp's view that sexual orientation depends on learning, but disagreed with the details of Tripp's account. He agreed with Tripp's criticisms of psychotherapy, but argued that Tripp's theories were "linked to psychoanalytic assumptions." He accused Tripp of seeking to legitimize homosexuality "by making it bland". He also criticized Whitmore for defending Tripp and expressed partial agreement with Hendin's review of the book. Lynch subsequently wrote that the book had been criticized for Tripp's failure to discuss the gay rights movement and negative view of women. According to Lynch, Tripp stated in an interview that he had not written about the gay liberation movement because he did not know enough about it, that he was amazed at the accusation of sexism made against the book, and that he believed the "gay press" had reacted with embarrassment to it, while the interviewer suggested that Tripp was hurt by such negative reactions.

Derbyshire dismissed the book, arguing that it was based in "bourgeois social science" and that Tripp did not appreciate the role of sexism in supporting taboos against homosexuality, which he viewed through "the ideological forms of advanced capitalism" and therefore misunderstood as a "unitary and trans-historical category". He also argued that Tripp had a sexist focus on gay men and mostly ignored lesbians, that he viewed male and female sexuality as "biological givens", and ignored alternative feminist and Marxist accounts of the oppression of gay men and lesbians. He contrasted Tripp's work unfavorably with that of the French philosophers Gilles Deleuze and Michel Foucault. Whitehead called the book a "rambling mixture of personal observation and popularized social science". She wrote that despite some "more promising kernels of thought", Tripp wrongly maintained that "the various forms of human sexual behavior as well as the various human reactions to these forms are reducible to a simple set of psychological imperatives." She described Tripp's model of heterosexual relations as sexist, criticized him for focusing only on male homosexuality, and noted that he barely mentioned the gay liberation movement.

Hendin called The Homosexual Matrix pseudoscience and Tripp an "erudite con man" who lacked impartiality and had a "bias toward homosexuality". He argued that Tripp saw homosexuality as superior to heterosexuality and sexual passion as dependent upon anger, mistakenly drew conclusions about heterosexuality from observations about homosexual behavior, and had a distorted view of sexual history and a negative view of women. He wrote that Tripp's conclusion that homosexuality is not related to fear or anger toward women, family relationships, or a reflection of confusion over sexual identity, was baseless. His review was followed by letters of protest from the historian Martin Duberman, Pomeroy, George Weinberg, and others, to which Hendin replied with a rebuttal. Karlen wrote that Tripp made numerous unjustified claims, such as that homosexual men tend to have a larger than average penis size and that there are no confirmed cases of homosexuals being converted to heterosexuality through therapy. He accused Tripp of trying to normalize or exalt homosexuality and denigrate heterosexuality and women, and those who endorsed his work of politicizing sex research. Socarides criticized Tripp for arguing that homosexuality is not pathological, presenting it as preferable to heterosexuality, incorrectly claiming that homosexual men tend to undergo puberty early and to have a larger than average penis size, making "slurs" against therapists who attempted to convert homosexuals to heterosexuality, and encouraging homosexuals not to undergo treatment.

See also

Books
 Gay Science
 Sexual Dissidence
 Sexual Preference
 The Evolution of Human Sexuality
 The Science of Desire

Topics
 Biology and sexual orientation
 Environment and sexual orientation
 Homosexual behavior in animals
 Homosexuality and psychology  DSM-III (1980) and DSM-III-R (1987)

References

Bibliography
Books

 
 
 
 
 
 
 
 
 
 
 
 
 
 

Journals

 
 
  
 
  
  
 
  
 
 
  
 

Online articles

 
 
 
 
 
 
 
 
 

1970s LGBT literature
1975 non-fiction books
American non-fiction books
Books about conversion therapy
Books about psychoanalysis
Books by Clarence Arthur Tripp
English-language books
LGBT literature in the United States
Non-fiction books about same-sex sexuality
McGraw-Hill books